Kerinci (Kinci or Kincai) is a Malayic language spoken in Jambi Province, Sumatra especially in Kerinci Regency and Sungai Penuh city. It has a high dialectical diversity, with dialects Ulu, Mamaq, Akit, Talang and Sakei.

Van Reijn (1974) notes that Kerinci shares many phonological similarities with Austroasiatic languages, such as sesquisyllabic word structure and vowel inventory.

References

Bibliography 
Van Reijn, E.O. (1974). "Some Remarks on the Dialects of North Kerintji: A link with Mon-Khmer Languages." Journal of the Malaysian Branch of the Royal Asiatic Society, 31, 2: 130-138.

Further reading 
 Ernanda. (2011). On the loss of the phrasal alternation in Pondok Tinggi dialect of Kerinci: A Stochastic Optimality Theory Approach (Master thesis). Faculty of *Arts. Radboud University Nijmegen.
 Ernanda. (2017). Phrasal alternation in Kerinci (Doctoral Dissertation). Leiden University Centre for Linguistics. Leiden University.
McKinnon, Timothy A. (2011). The Morphology and Morphosyntax of Kerinci Word Shape Alternations. University of Delaware, Doctoral Dissertation.
McKinnon, Timothy, Yanti, Peter Cole, Gabriella Hermon. 2012. Divergent Varieties of Malay in Upstream Jambi. Paper given at ISMIL 16.
McKinnon, Timothy A. What is Kerinci? An closer look at the geography of its core properties.
Usman, A. Hakim (1988). Fonologi dan Morfologi Bahasa Kerinci Dialek Sungai Penuh. Jakarta: Universitas Indonesia Fakultas Pascasarjana Doctoral Dissertation.

Languages of Indonesia
Languages of Malaysia
Agglutinative languages
Malayic languages